Mermaid Avenue is a 1998 album of previously unheard lyrics written by American folk singer Woody Guthrie, put to music written and performed by British singer Billy Bragg and the American band Wilco. The project was the first of several such projects organized by Guthrie's daughter, Nora Guthrie, original director of the Woody Guthrie Foundation and archives. Mermaid Avenue was released on the Elektra Records label on June 23, 1998. A second volume of recordings, Mermaid Avenue Vol. II, followed in 2000 and both were collected in a box set alongside volume three in 2012 as Mermaid Avenue: The Complete Sessions. The projects are named after the song "Mermaid's Avenue", written by Guthrie. This was also the name of the street in Coney Island, New York, on which Guthrie lived. According to American Songwriter Magazine, "The Mermaid Avenue project is essential for showing that Woody Guthrie could illuminate what was going on inside of him as well as he could detail the plight of his fellow man". It was voted number 939 in Colin Larkin's All Time Top 1000 Albums 3rd Edition (2000).

Recording
During the spring of 1995, Woody Guthrie's daughter Nora contacted English singer-songwriter Billy Bragg about writing music for a selection of completed Guthrie lyrics after Bragg played a Guthrie tribute concert in New York City's Central Park. Her father had left behind over a thousand sets of complete lyrics written between 1939 and 1967; as they had not been recorded by Guthrie, and he did not write music, none of these lyrics had any music other than a vague stylistic notation.

Nora Guthrie's liner notes in Mermaid Avenue indicate that it was her intention that the songs be given to a new generation of musicians who would be able to make the songs relevant to a younger generation. Nora Guthrie contacted Bragg, who in turn approached Wilco and asked them to participate in the project as well. Wilco agreed, and in addition to recording with Bragg in Ireland, they were given their own share of songs to finish.

Rather than recreating tunes in Guthrie's style, Bragg and Wilco created new, contemporary music for the lyrics. Released in 1998 as Mermaid Avenue, the results were met with critical success. The album received a Grammy nomination for Best Contemporary Folk Album, and went on to place fourth on the Pazz & Jop Critics Poll for 1998.

Since the release of the Mermaid Avenue albums, several other musicians have released recordings that similarly have drawn upon  unpublished Guthrie material.

Man in the Sand, a documentary about the collaboration between Billy Bragg and Wilco, was released in 1999. A DVD of the film is included in Mermaid Avenue: The Complete Sessions.

Bob Dylan tells in his autobiography that Woody Guthrie asked him to reach out to Guthrie's wife Margie and get the boxes of songs and poems that had been written but never set to melodies. Dylan makes his way to Guthrie's place but Margie was not there, only Guthrie's son Arlo and the babysitter. Neither had any idea about the box, and Dylan headed back to New York. Dylan writes in his autobiography Chronicles: "Forty years later, these lyrics would fall into the hands of Billy Bragg and the group Wilco and they would put melodies to them, bring them to full life and record them. It was all done under the direction of Woody's daughter Nora. These performers  probably weren't even born when I had made that trip to Brooklyn."

Track listing

Personnel
Billy Bragg – lead vocals (1, 3, 6, 8, 10, 12, 15), backing vocals (7), acoustic guitar (1, 2, 3, 4, 8, 10, 15), electric guitar (5, 13), National guitar (9, 12), banjo (12), bouzouki (7), handclaps (10)
Jay Bennett – piano (1, 2, 9, 10, 11, 12, 13), grand piano (14, 15), Hammond B-3 organ (3, 5, 7, 10, 11), clavinet (1, 9), Farfisa organ (1), Farfisa bass pedals (5), electric bass (6), electric guitar (13), acoustic guitar (6), slide guitar (6), bouzouki (3), dulcimer (7), banjo (9), melodica (12, 15), backing vocals (1, 2, 6, 7, 10, 13), drums (1), percussion (12), handclaps (10)
Ken Coomer – drums (1, 2, 3, 5, 6, 7, 9, 10, 11, 13, 15), percussion (1, 2, 3, 9, 12), backing vocals (1, 10), handclaps (10)
John Stirratt – electric bass (2, 3, 5, 6, 7, 10, 11, 13, 15), acoustic bass (1, 9), bass piano (5), bass pedals (9), backing vocals (1, 2, 7, 10), acoustic guitar (6), Hammond B-3 organ (6), handclaps (10)
Jeff Tweedy – lead vocals (2, 5, 7, 9, 11, 13, 14), backing vocals (1, 10), acoustic guitar (2, 6, 7, 9, 11, 15), electric guitar (1, 10), harmonica (1, 6, 15), handclaps (10)

Additional musicians
Johnathan "JP" Parker – backing vocals (1)
Eliza Carthy – violin (2, 3)
Corey Harris – lap steel guitar (2), electric guitar (5), backing vocals (10), handclaps (10)
Peter Yanowitz – chorus drums (3)
Elizabeth Steen – accordion (3)
Natalie Merchant – backing vocals (3), lead vocals (4)
Bob Egan – slide guitar (6), pedal steel (11, 15)

Charts

Certifications

See also
Woody Guthrie Foundation
Man in the Sand (1999)
Mermaid Avenue Vol. II (2000)
Wonder Wheel (2006)
Woody Guthrie's Happy Joyous Hanukkah (2006)
The Works (2008)
New Multitudes (2012)
Mermaid Avenue: The Complete Sessions (2012)

References

External links
 Nora Guthrie interview

Wilco albums
Billy Bragg albums
1998 albums
Folk revival albums
Albums produced by Grant Showbiz
Elektra Records albums
Collaborative albums
Woody Guthrie tribute albums
Albums produced by Jeff Tweedy